Trevor Mills Byfield (20 October 1943 – 11 October 2017) was a British character actor particularly well known for his roles on British television. In many of his later roles he was credited as Zig Byfield.

Theatre work
Prior to his work in television and film he appeared in several stage musicals under the name Ziggy Byfield. These included the 1970s production of Hair, where he appeared alongside Joan Armatrading, Richard O'Brien, Paul Nicholas and Floella Benjamin. He also appeared later in Richard O’Brien's The Rocky Horror Show.

Television work
Byfield featured in many popular British television programmes over several decades, these included Heartbeat, EastEnders, Casualty, Holby City, Coronation Street, Family Affairs, Doctors, Only Fools and Horses, Inspector Morse (as the title character in the episode "Who Killed Harry Field?"), One Foot in the Grave, Birds of a Feather, The Professionals, Minder, Spooks, Lovejoy, So Haunt Me and New Tricks. He appeared in seventeen episodes of The Bill in fourteen different roles.

Personal life
Byfield married Janet Offor in 1966 and they had two children together, but subsequently divorced.

Accident
In January 2009 he suffered a broken hip and ribs as well as a collapsed lung, when a tractor that he was driving lost control on a road and hit trees before rolling down an embankment during filming of the ITV show Heartbeat near Grosmont. Four crew members were also hurt. Byfield was airlifted to hospital.

Death
Byfield died in 2017 following a bout of pneumonia, he was 73.

Partial filmography

Film

Television

References

External links

1943 births
2017 deaths
English male stage actors
English male film actors
English male soap opera actors
Actors from Preston, Lancashire